Christoff Beck (born 23 January 1964 in Vienna) is an Austrian former competitive ice dancer. Competing with his sister, Kathrin Beck, he became the 1987 Winter Universiade champion, a two-time Skate Canada International medalist (silver in 1987, bronze in 1985), and a six-time Austrian national champion (1983–1988). They finished fifth at the 1988 Winter Olympics in Calgary, Canada. They trained six days a week, fifty weeks a year.

Beck studied law at the University of Vienna and opened his own law firm in 2002. He has three sons.

Results
(ice dance with Kathrin Beck)

References

External links

Navigation

Austrian male ice dancers
Olympic figure skaters of Austria
Figure skaters at the 1988 Winter Olympics
Universiade medalists in figure skating
1964 births
Living people
Universiade gold medalists for Austria
Universiade bronze medalists for Austria
Competitors at the 1985 Winter Universiade
Competitors at the 1987 Winter Universiade